The Jokioinen Museum Railway is located in Jokioinen, Finland. It is located on the last operating commercial narrow gauge railway in Finland, the  gauge Jokioinen Railway.

The museum was established on February 2, 1978, four years after the discontinued operation of the commercially-operated railway, when the new Jokioinen Museum Railway Limited joint stock company bought the rail line from Jokioinen to Minkiö railway station, with its land and associated buildings. Museum steam trains began running that same year. In 1994 the line was extended with an  stretch between Minkiö and Humppila.

The museum railway station at Humppila is beside the station of the Turku-Toijala VR line, providing a convenient access to the museum.

The Minkiö station has a narrow gauge museum with a collection of carriages and locomotives. There are a number other attractions in the vicinity of the railway.

Gallery

See also
 Finnish Railway Museum
 VR Group
 List of Finnish locomotives
 List of railway museums Worldwide
 Heritage railways
 List of heritage railways
 Restored trains
 Hanko–Hyvinkää railway
 History of rail transport in Finland
 VR Class Pr1
 VR Class Hr1
 VR Class Tk3
 VR Class Hr11

External links

Jokioinen Museum Railway website (trilingual, English included)
Finnish Railway Museum Official website
Steam Locomotives in Finland Including the Finnish Railway Museum
Write up on a visit to the Jokioinen Railway

Jokioinen
Railway lines in Finland
Railway lines opened in 1978
Heritage railways in Finland
Railway museums in Finland
750 mm gauge railways in Finland
Museums in Kanta-Häme
1978 establishments in Finland